Independencia Municipality may refer to the following places in the Venezuela:

Independencia Municipality, Anzoátegui
Independencia Municipality, Miranda
Independencia Municipality, Táchira
Independencia Municipality, Yaracuy

Municipality name disambiguation pages